Castle Rock Estate is an Australian winery based at Porongurup, in the Great Southern wine region of Western Australia and owned and operated by the Diletti family.  According to prominent Australian wine writer James Halliday, it has an exceptionally beautifully sited and immaculately maintained vineyard, winery and cellar door sales area with sweeping vistas from the Porongurups.

Winemaker
Castle Rock Estate's winemaker is Rob Diletti, son of founders Angelo and Wendy Diletti. Rob was one of 12 scholars at the 2005 Len Evans Tutorial, 2006 Wine Selectors Young Winemaker of the Year, a finalist for the 2012 Gourmet Traveller WINE Winemaker of the Year and, in 2015, Rob Diletti was named Wine Companion Winemaker of the Year.
In 2019 Rob Diletti has been named a finalist in the Gourmet Traveller Wine Magazine Winemaker of the Year.

Awards 
In 2018 Castle Rock was award the Most Successful Exhibitor processing under 250 Tonnes at the 2018 Wine Show of Western Australia.

The winery was awarded:
 Trophy for the Best Great Southern White Wine, Castle Rock 2018 Porongurup Riesling, 2018 Wine Show of Western Australia 
 Trophy for the Best Riesling of the Show, Castle Rock 2018 Porongurup Riesling, 2018 Wine Show of Western Australia 
 Trophy for the Best Pinot Noir of the Show, Castle Rock 2018 Porongurup Pinot Noir, 2018 Wine Show of Western Australia

See also

 Australian wine
 List of wineries in Western Australia
 Western Australian wine

References

Notes

Bibliography

External links
 – official site

Companies established in 1983
Great Southern (Western Australia)
Wineries in Western Australia
1983 establishments in Australia